The Tata Revotron engine is a family of 3-cylinder petrol engines produced by Tata Motors, currently used in the passenger vehicles.

The first engine from the Revotron line was introduced in 2014. Revotron petrol 1.2T is a 1.2-litre, 3-cylinder, turbocharged, intercooled, multi-point fuel injected unit. It produces 86 PS at 6000 rpm, and 113 Nm of torque @ 3300 rpm. The engine features multiple driving modes for better throttle response, a Smart ECU, an eight-holed fuel injector, a stiffened crankcase, and a new catalytic converter.
In Tata zest and bolt this engine was introduced with 4 cylinders.

See also 
 Tata Motors
 List of Ford engines

References

Gasoline engines
Internal combustion piston engines
Tata Motors